The 66th Bodil Awards were held on 16 March 2013 in the Bremen Theater in Copenhagen, Denmark, honouring the best national and foreign films of 2012. A Hijacking won the award for Best Danish Film. Generally the awards were distributed among many films this year.

Bent Fabricius-Bjerre received a Bodil Honorary Award for his work in film music, scoring more than 100 films throughout his career.

Winners

Best Danish Film 
 A Hijacking
 
 Teddy Bear
 A Royal Affair
 You and Me Forever

Best Documentary 
 Putin's Kiss

Best Actor in a Leading Role 
 Mikkel Følsgaard – A Royal Affair
 Mads Mikkelsen – A Royal Affair
 Søren Malling – A Hijacking
 Pilou Asbæk – A Hijacking
 Lars Mikkelsen – A Caretaker's Tale

Best Actress in a Leading Role 
  – 
 Trine Dyrholm – Love Is All You Need
 Julie Brohorst Andersen – You and Me Forever
 Alicia Vikander – A Royal Affair
 Bodil Jørgensen – This Life

Best Actor in a Supporting Role 
  Tommy Kenter – The Passion of Marie
 Nicolas Bro – 
 Roland Møller – A Hijacking
 Lars Bom  – Max Embarrassing 2
 Thomas W. Gabrielsson – A Royal Affair

Best Actress in a Supporting Role 
 Frederikke Dahl Hansen –  You and Me Forever
 Emilie Claudius Kruse – You and Me Forever
 Elsebeth Stentoft – Teddy Bear
  – 
 Trine Dyrholm –  A Royal Affair

Best Cinematography 
 Rasmus Videbæk – A Royal Affair

Best American Film 
 Martha Marcy May Marlene
 The Descendants
 Moonrise Kingdom
 Take Shelter
 We Need to Talk About Kevin

Best Non-American Film 
 Amour
 The Artist
 Shame
 Searching for Sugar Man
 Holy Motors

Bodil Special Award 
 The Act of Killing  by Joshua Oppenheimer  (film distributor,  Miracle Film)

Bodil Honorary Award 
 Bent Fabricius-Bjerre

Audience Award 
 This Life

Henning Bahs Award 
 Niels Sejer (scenography) A Royal Affair

See also 

 2013 Robert Awards

References 

2013 in Copenhagen
2012 film awards
Bodil Awards ceremonies
March 2013 events in Europe